Matthew Dominic Lockwood (born 17 October 1976) is an English former footballer and coach who is currently head coach of the Montserrat national football team. He played for teams including Leyton Orient, Nottingham Forest and Dundee. Lockwood was known for his attacking qualities from left back and his goal scoring abilities.

Club career

Early career
Born in Southend-on-Sea, Essex, Lockwood was a trainee with hometown club Southend United before signing a professional contract with Queens Park Rangers on 2 May 1995. Lockwood was part of the highly successful QPR reserve team that won the Avon Combination league in the 95/96 season. Unlucky not to break into the first team, he impressed teammate Ian Holloway enough throughout the season for Holloway to make Lockwood one of his first signings when he was appointed Player/Manager at Bristol Rovers. Holloway saw something in Lockwood that no other manager had at this point in his career. Holloway converted Lockwood from a central midfielder to a left back and Lockwood admits that Holloway had the biggest influence on his professional career. Lockwood made his first professional impact at Bristol Rovers where he made 76 appearances until the end of the 1997–98 season.

Leyton Orient
Having completed his contract at Bristol Rovers, Lockwood moved on a free transfer to Leyton Orient where he became an integral part of the first team. In two seasons, Lockwood was named PFA Team of the Year in 1999–00 season and 2000–01 season. These performances attracted the attention of many Premier League clubs. Unfortunately Leyton Orients asking price for the young full back was slightly on the high side and although they received offers in the region of £500,000, they did not accept.

The following couple of seasons then saw his performances attract the attention of Clubs in the Championship, like Millwall, West Bromwich Albion and Crystal Palace. This led the club to offer him an improved contract after again pricing the full back out of a move away from The Matchroom Stadium. Lockwood signed an improved two-year deal at the end of the season.

In 2006, Lockwood was named as the 47th best player outside of the Premier League in a study by FourFourTwo magazine. The study named Lockwood as the best player at left back and the fourth best player in the League Two.

Lockwood was Leyton Orient's second leading goal scorer in the 2006–07 season which included an 11-minute hat-trick in a thrilling game at Brisbane Road vs Gillingham, securing a 3–3 draw after the Os had been 3–0 down with 13 minutes remaining. He scored 11 goals from left-back that season. He was named in the PFA League One Team of the Year for 2006–07.

Spleen injury
During the 2001–02 season, Lockwood suffered a significant spleen injury during a match against York City in August 2001 when he collided with the opposition player. His injury was life-threatening after doctors told him his condition quickly deteriorated. However, he soon recovered after being out for months, and made his first appearance against Crystal Palace reserves. After the match, Lockwood said: "It was great to be back and the management felt I did well and are pleased with my progress. If I can get a few more reserve games under my belt I hope to be back in first-team contention as soon as possible. The injury does not play on my mind and I am just trying to forget it now."

Nottingham Forest
In July 2007, Lockwood signed for League One giants Nottingham Forest for an undisclosed fee. He signed a two-year contract with the club. Orient manager Martin Ling said "He's been very close to signing for top flight teams in the past, and I think he felt at this stage of his career it was too good an opportunity to turn down." Lockwood made his debut on the opening day of the season, in the 0–0 draw at home to Bournemouth but an ankle injury kept him sidelined for the first three months of the season.

In the 2007–08 campaign, Lockwood featured 11 times. He helped Forest gain automatic promotion finishing second in the league, as Forest were promoted from League One to the Championship. At the end of the season, Colchester United who had just been relegated from the Championship had their £100k move for Lockwood accepted. Forest were reluctant to let Lockwood leave but agreed to sell due to the players desire for guaranteed first team football.

Colchester United
He signed for Colchester United for an undisclosed fee in June 2008. On the opening game of the season, Lockwood made his debut in a 4–2 loss against Hartlepool United. He only made three appearances in the first half of the season due to an injury he suffered in August, leaving him sidelined 3 months. During this time Colchester changed managers and once Lockwood got fit, found his first team opportunities limited due to the new manager signing another left back without even seeing Lockwood kick a ball. By January, Lockwood made his recovery from his knee problem and returned to training. Towards the end of the season, he would make two more appearances.

Colchester announced that his contract would not be renewed when it expires at the end of the following season. Prior to his release, Lockwood says he couldn't wait to leave the club. After leaving the club, he was linked with a return to Colchester, under new manager John Ward but he refused, describing his time there as a 'nightmare'.

Loan moves
Lockwood joined Barnet on loan in February 2009. After the move, Lockwood explained he decided to join Barnet to build up his match fitness after 3 months out injured. 
 During his stay, the club have picked up eight points from a possible 15 to drag them away from the immediate danger of the drop.

On 30 October 2009, he signed a one-month loan deal at Dagenham & Redbridge. He made his debut against Port Vale and completed his loan on 30 November 2009.

In January 2010 he joined Barnet on loan for another month, and scored his first goal for the club against Morecambe on 23 January 2010. The loan period was extended to the end of the season
.

Dundee
On 20 August 2010, Lockwood signed a one-year deal for Dundee. He made his debut in a 0–0 draw against Ross County.

On 2 October 2010, Lockwood scored his first goal for the club from the penalty spot and set up a winning goal in a 2–1 win against Morton.

At the end of October 2010 following the club entering administration and making numerous redundancies including 9 first team players plus the manager and assistant manager, Lockwood was appointed as player/assistant manager of Dundee, due to his desire to go into management and the fact he had done his A licence coaching qualification. Lockwood spoke out about the club's administration, saying the club were prepared to stay up against all the odds after being deducted 25 points in the league. During the club's administration, Lockwood would help Dundee to a 23 match unbeaten run beating the previous club record set by the league winning team of the 60's. This unbelievable run of results with just 11 first team players at the club helped Dundee to escape relegation. The club also exited administration at the end of the season. In his first season, he made thirty-four appearances, scored five goals and was voted the club's player of the year.
 
The following season,Lockwood scored in the opening game against Partick Thistle in which Dundee won 1–0. At the end of the season, Lockwood signed a new deal. Shortly after signing, he revealed he has settled in Scotland which persuaded him to stay at Dundee.

Dundee finished in second place in the 2011/2012 season, but advanced to the Scottish Premier League to replace Rangers after they went into liquidation and new club The Rangers were allowed into Division Three. Lockwood made his SPL debut in a 0–0 draw against Kilmarnock on the opening day of the season. Three months later, Lockwood scored his first goal of the season with a trademark freekick which flew into the top corner, as Dundee won 1–0 against Heart of Midlothian

Following Dundee's relegation, Lockwood signed a new one-year deal having impressed new manager John Brown while playing at left back, centre back and as a sweeper towards the end of the previous season. Lockwood continued to play sweeper and centre half at the start of the 2013/2014 season but moved to his more familiar left back role a couple of months into the season. Dundee went on a good run of form which saw them top the table at the start of December 2013. His performances were praised by Brown, quoting: "Matt has been great for us since I've been here. You can see why he's played at a much higher level and he's comfortable at full-back and in the middle of the defence. As well as his own game, he's a very good talker and organiser and keeps the younger players right during games." Lockwood's was referred to as "Dens Park's Ryan Giggs" by Dundee fans.

As the season progress, Manager John Brown was sacked. Lockwood applied for the vacant manager's position, but Paul Hartley was hired instead. At the end of the season, Lockwood was released by the club. After being released, Lockwood expressed an interest in becoming the Manager of Greenock Morton, who were relegated from the Scottish Championship. His release was later confirmed on 10 June 2014. Upon leaving the club, Lockwood revealed no one from Dundee had contacted him to tell him he wasn't being offered a new deal. He found out he was being released after a Dundee fan had told him it was on the club's website. Lockwood said his four years at Dundee were eventful and that he had enjoyed his time at the club but was disappointed with how he was treated at the end. The majority of people in Dundee were surprised to see Lockwood get released as someone of Lockwood's quality isn't easily replaced. On and off the pitch he is well respected by everyone involved in football.

Sutton United
Lockwood signed for Sutton United as player coach in 2014.

Coaching career
In 2023, Lockwood was appointed head coach of the Montserrat national football team.

Honours

Club
Nottingham Forest
Football League One runner-up: 2007–08

Dundee FC
Scottish Championship Winners: 2013–14

Individual
PFA Team of the Year (4): 1999–2000, 2000–01, 2005–06, 2006–07
PFA Scotland Team of the Year (1): 2010–11

References

External links

1976 births
Living people
Sportspeople from Southend-on-Sea
English footballers
Association football defenders
Southend United F.C. players
Queens Park Rangers F.C. players
Bristol Rovers F.C. players
Leyton Orient F.C. players
Nottingham Forest F.C. players
Colchester United F.C. players
Barnet F.C. players
Dagenham & Redbridge F.C. players
Dundee F.C. players
Sutton United F.C. players
Montserrat national football team managers 
English Football League players
Scottish Football League players
Scottish Premier League players
Scottish Professional Football League players